Sergio Muñoz Gajardo (born 10 February 1957) is a Chilean lawyer who has served as president of the Supreme Court of Chile.

References

External links
 News at Alberto Hurtado University

1957 births
Chilean people
Living people
Pontifical Catholic University of Valparaíso alumni
Supreme Court of Chile members